Tinamus  is a genus of birds in the tinamou family Tinamidae . This genus comprises some of the larger members of this South American family.

Taxonomy
The genus Tinamus was introduced in 1783 by the French naturalist Johann Hermann. The type species was subsequently designated as the great tinamou. Hermann based his name on "Les Tinamous" used by Georges-Louis Leclerc, Comte de Buffon in his Histoire Naturelle des Oiseaux. The word "Tinamú" in the Carib language of French Guiana was used for the tinamous.

The genus contains five species:

 White-throated tinamou (Tinamus guttatus) – southeastern Colombia, southern Venezuela, Amazonian Brazil, and northern Bolivia
 Grey tinamou (Tinamus tao) – northern and western Brazil, eastern Ecuador, eastern Peru, northern Bolivia, Colombia east of the Andes, northwestern and northeastern Venezuela, and northwestern Guyana
 Solitary tinamou (Tinamus solitarius) – northeastern Argentina (Misiones), eastern Paraguay, eastern Brazil
 Black tinamou (Tinamus osgoodi) – in two small areas: the Andes of southeastern Peru and the Andes of Colombia
 Great tinamou (Tinamus major) – from southeastern Mexico through Panama, excluding Honduras and from Ecuador to French Guiana, parts of Brazil and northern Bolivia

References

 
Bird genera